Nathaniel "Nat" Ho (born 23 August 1984) is a Singaporean actor and singer.

Career
Ho was originally one of the Top 30 contestants in the inaugural season of Singapore Idol in 2004. He was also awarded the 'Most Promising Artiste' in 2004, by the Singapore Armed Forces Music and Drama Company. One of his first acting roles was in the Channel 5 drama Shooting Stars. Following that, Nat was given the lead role in a local feature film, Smell of Rain.

While pursuing his diploma in Mass Communications, Ho dabbled in modeling after he was discovered by a modeling agent. His portfolio included clients like M1, Lipton Tea, KFC, Marina Square Shopping Centre and Tiger Balm.

He also did freelance work as a backup dancer for a few commercial jobs, which included Indian International Film Academy Awards'04 and Miss Singapore Universe'06 to name a few. During his modelling period, he also did freelance acting, and landed his first ever acting gig, in the independent Mandarin feature film, Smell of Rain (雨之味).

The following year, he was signed on with MediaCorp and cast in his first Chinese language drama series Honour and Passion which earned him a Best Newcomer nomination at that Star Awards 2007.

Ho left MediaCorp in 2010 to focus on his music career. He stated that music was his real passion and that he actually "never wanted to be an actor. [All this] came as a bonus". He released his first album Unleashed in April 2012 and an accompanying music video featuring actresses Dawn Yeoh and Le Yao and blogger Xiaxue.

In 2013, Ho announced that he would be moving to Taiwan to further his music career, after signing a nine-year music contract.

In 2020, Ho left for Los Angeles to study music production for personal growth. This lasted for a year that allows Ho to focus on songwriting and production. In August 2022, Ho again announced he would be moving to South Korea to further his music career in the K-Pop market. He has also signed up for Korean language classes with Yonsei University.

Personal life
Ho attended the Anglo-Chinese School (Independent), and was a member of the school's award-winning choir for 4 years, and completed his A Levels at Anglo-Chinese Junior College.

Filmography

Television

Film
2005
Smell of Rain 《雨之味》
2008
Heng Or Huat 《天降运财》
2009
Autumn in March 《午夜烟花》
2011
Already Famous

Variety shows (appearing as a guest)
2006
Wish Upon A Star
2007
Crime Watch
Hey Gorgeous!  《校花校草追赶跑》
President Star Charity 2007 《总统星光慈善2007》
The Cancer Charity Show 2007 《癌过有晴天》
Star Awards 2007
Let's Party with Food V 《食福满人间V》
The Mission 4  《创业无敌手4》
2009
Okto Live – 3 Feb 2009
Hey Gorgeous! Finals 2009 《校花校草网上追赶跑》 – 7 March 09
Go Live! 《综艺Go Live!》 – 27 Apr 09
Result is All 《美就是一切》 – 22 August 2009

Radio interview

2010
93.3FM  – (Co-Host with Pei Fen on 夜玩场) – 15 April 2010 to 14 May 2010 (9 – 11pm, every Thursday and Friday)

TV hosting
2008
National Science Challenge 2008
2009
National Science Challenge 2009
Food Hometown 2 《美食寻根 2》
Celebrate 2010
2010
Go! YOG 艺起青奥 – 25 March 2010
Okto minute of fame – June to Sept 2010

Album/MTV
2006
December Stars
2007
Sang sub-theme song for Mediacorp Ch 8 《百万宝》
Sing- The Best Drama 《剧欣卉集》 – Theme song for Mediacorp Ch 8 《凡间新仙人》 – 《完美的爱情》
December Stars 2 Compilation  –  Last Christmas
2008
Mediacorp Lunar New Year Album Compilation 《群星贺岁 – 金鼠庆团圆》 –　《恭喜大家过新年》
NDP 2008 Theme Song – MTV
2009
Mediacorp Lunar New Year Album Compilation 《群星贺岁 – 福牛迎瑞年》 – 《新年到》

Advertisement/TV commercial
2004
M1 Print Ad Campaign
2005
Lipton Tea TVC (Vietnam)
Franklin Templeton TVC
Tiger Balm Print Ad + TVC
Canon Pixma Print Ad
KFC Fish Ole Burger TVC
Catalog Magazine (L’Oreal)
M1 Print Ad Campaign
Marina Square TVC
2007
Speak Mandarin
Crocodile Print Ad (Spring/Summer Collection)
2008
Crocodile Print Ad (Autumn/Winter Collection)
Audio Technica Print Ad
Nivea Men Print Ad + Bus Ad
Singtel MioTV Interstitial!
Singapore Tourism Board (STB) Christmas 2008 Interstitial
2009
Artiste MBlog
Channel 5 advertisement on Saving Gaia
Channel 5's Christmas Bonanza 21009
Bossini TVC
2010
987FM Interstitial
F&N Lunar New Year Celebration TVC
Dengue Fever Interstitial

Music video appearances

Accolades

Endorsements
2007
Crocodile
2008
Crocodile
Audio Technica
Nivea Men

References

External links 
Profile on xin.msn.com

1984 births
Singaporean people of Hakka descent
Anglo-Chinese School alumni
Anglo-Chinese Junior College alumni
Singaporean television personalities
Singaporean male television actors
21st-century Singaporean male actors
Living people
Singaporean male film actors
Male web series actors